Flat Top is a prominent ice-covered mountain, over 4000 m, with a broad, flat summit area, standing just east of the head of Osicki Glacier. It is the highest point in the Commonwealth Range in Antarctica. Named by the British Antarctic Expedition (1910-13) as being descriptive.

Mountains of the Ross Dependency
Queen Maud Mountains
Four-thousanders of Antarctica